Events in the year 2022 in Luxembourg.

Incumbents 

 Monarch: Henri
 Prime Minister: Xavier Bettel

Events 
Ongoing — COVID-19 pandemic in Luxembourg

 17 June – Luxembourg report their first confirmed cases of monkeypox.

Sports 

 7 August 2021 - 22 May 2022: 2021–22 Luxembourg National Division
 7 August 2022 - 21 May 2023: 2022–23 Luxembourg National Division

Deaths 

 12 January – Joseph Zangerle, 72, footballer (Union Luxembourg, national team)
 19 February – Jacques Poos, 86, politician, minister of finances (1976–1979) and foreign affairs (1984–1999), deputy prime minister (1984–1999).
 4 July – Hubert Erang, 91, Olympic gymnast (1952, 1960).
 24 July – Alain David, 90, Luxembourg-born French Olympic sprinter (1956).

References 

 
2020s in Luxembourg
Years of the 21st century in Luxembourg
Luxembourg
Luxembourg